The 1988 Peach Bowl, part of the 1988 bowl season, took place on December 31, 1988, at Atlanta–Fulton County Stadium in Atlanta, Georgia. The competing teams were the Iowa Hawkeyes, representing the Big Ten Conference, and the NC State Wolfpack of the Atlantic Coast Conference (ACC). In the second meeting between the schools, NC State was victorious by a final score of 28–23.

Teams

Iowa

The Iowa Hawkeyes kicked off the 1988 season with a #9 preseason ranking. With two losses in their first three games, Iowa fell out of the rankings for good. The Hawkeyes finished conference play with only one loss, but endured three ties to finish the regular season at 6-3-3 and 4-1-3 in Big Ten play.

NC State

The Wolfpack finished 3rd in the ACC, and handed conference champion Clemson its only league loss. The team finished ranked #18 in the final Coaches' Poll.

Game summary
This installment of the Peach Bowl was played through a steady rain. The teams combined for 14 turnovers (7 each) and 12 fumbles (8 lost). The sloppy conditions were a factor from the start, as NC State's Lee Knight recovered a fumble by Iowa's Chet Davis on the game's opening kickoff. The Hawkeye defense made it tough, but the Wolfpack capitalized four plays later on Charles Davenport's touchdown plunge on 4th and goal. Iowa managed a field goal later in the opening stanza to bring the score to 7–3.

NC State exploded for three touchdowns in the second quarter to take a 28–3 lead. Danny Peebles outran the coverage and caught a 75-yard bomb from Shane Montgomery on the quarter's first play, then Tyrone Jackson added two touchdown runs to stretch the lead. The Wolfpack scored 21 points on touchdown runs following Iowa fumbles. In all, the Hawkeyes committed five first-half turnovers. Iowa managed a touchdown before half to close the gap to 28–10.

Scoring slowed in the second half due to deteriorating field conditions, though Iowa continued to fight with a touchdown in each of the final two quarters.

In the loss, Chuck Hartlieb set a Peach Bowl record with 428 passing yards. He completed 30 of 51 pass attempts for 3 touchdowns, but was intercepted 4 times – 3 of those by Defensive MVP Michael Brooks.

References

Peach Bowl
Peach Bowl
Iowa Hawkeyes football bowl games
NC State Wolfpack football bowl games
1988 in sports in Georgia (U.S. state)
December 1988 sports events in the United States